Pennkulathin Ponvilakku ( Golden Lamp of Womanhood) is a 1959 Indian Tamil language film directed by B. Vittalacharya. The film stars Gemini Ganesan and M. N. Rajam.

Plot 
The film deals with three ladies – Parvathi, a perfect wife and an epitome of womanhood, her sister-in-law Kala, a staunch believer in woman's liberation, and Kala's friend Lalitha, a divorcee, who has no qualms in living with anybody for a little wealth. Kodandam, a self proclaimed bachelor comes to Kala's house to teach her music. He is forcibly married to her and is burdened with the task of taming the shrew. The rest of the movie deals with the lessons the ladies learn through the experiences they undergo in life.

Cast 
Cast list are from the film credits.

Male cast
 Gemini Ganeshan
 M. N. Nambiar
 P. V. Narasimha Bharathi
 A. Karunanidhi
 S. A. Asokan 
 K. K. Soundar
 Nagesh
 S. R. Gopal

Female cast
 M. N. Rajam
 Sriranjani
 K. V. Shanthi
 C. K. Saraswathi
 Vittoba
 Kalyani Ammal
Dance
 Sukumari-Mathangi

Soundtrack 
Music was scored by M. Venu, while the lyrics were penned by Muhavai Rajamanickam and Villiputhan. Playback singers are: C. S. Jayaraman, Seergazhi Govindarajan, Salem Govindan, M. L. Vasanthakumari, P. Leela, P. Susheela and K. Jamuna Rani.

References

External links 
 
 
 

Indian drama films
Films about women in India
Indian feminist films
1950s Tamil-language films